The 2012 Morocco Tennis Tour – Rabat was a professional tennis tournament played on clay courts. It was the sixth edition of the tournament which was part of the 2012 ATP Challenger Tour. It took place in Rabat, Morocco between 12 and 18 March 2012.

ATP entrants

Seeds

 1 Rankings are as of March 5, 2012.

Other entrants
The following players received wildcards into the singles main draw:
  Yassine Idmbarek
  Lamine Ouahab
  Younès Rachidi
  Mehdi Ziadi

The following players received entry as an alternate into the singles main draw:
  Íñigo Cervantes Huegun

The following players received entry from the qualifying draw:
  Alberto Brizzi
  Alessio di Mauro
  Bastian Knittel
  Janez Semrajč

The following players received entry as a lucky loser into the singles main draw:
  Victor Crivoi
  Guillermo Olaso

Champions

Singles

 Martin Kližan def.  Filippo Volandri, 6–2, 6–3

Doubles

 Íñigo Cervantes Huegun /  Federico Delbonis def.  Martin Kližan /  Stéphane Robert, 6–7(3–7), 6–3, [10–5]

External links
Official Website
ITF Search
ATP official site

Morocco Tennis Tour – Rabat
Rabat